Bajer Bridge is located between the Vrata and Oštrovica interchanges of the A6 motorway in Gorski Kotar, Croatia, spanning Lake Bajer. The bridge consists of two parallel structures: The first one was completed in 1995, and the second one in 2008. The bridge is tolled within the A6 motorway ticket system and there are no separate toll plazas associated with use of the bridge. The bridge was constructed by Viadukt.

Structure description
At this location the motorway route follows a horizontal curve of  radius. Transversal grade of the deck is constant and equal to 2.5%, while elevation grade of the bridge is constant at 0.835%, sloping down towards Oštrovica. The bridge is a box girder structure supporting the deck across 10 spans:  + 8 x  + . The main longitudinal girders comprise box cross-section and were divided in 19 sections each (2 x  + 15 x  + 2 x ). Bridge abutments and shore piers have shallow foundations, while those piers located within the lake have foundations executed on groups of six piles each. The piles are circular in cross section,  in diameter, and are connected with beam cap slabs measuring  x  x .

Traffic volume
Traffic is regularly counted and reported by Autocesta Rijeka–Zagreb, operator of the viaduct and the A6 motorway where the structure is located, and published by Hrvatske ceste. Substantial variations between annual (AADT) and summer (ASDT) traffic volumes are attributed to the fact that the bridge carries substantial tourist traffic to the Adriatic resorts. The traffic count is performed using analysis of motorway toll ticket sales.

See also
List of bridges by length

References

External links
Autocesta Rijeka–Zagreb: Bajer Bridge webcam

Box girder bridges
Bridges completed in 1995
Toll bridges in Croatia
Buildings and structures in Primorje-Gorski Kotar County
Transport in Primorje-Gorski Kotar County